Dezső Garas (9 December 1934 – 30 December 2011) was a Hungarian actor, who 
appeared in more than 145 films and television shows since 1956. He starred in the 1993 film Whoops, which was entered into the 43rd Berlin International Film Festival. Garas died in Budapest on 30 December 2011, aged 77, following a long kidney-related illness.

Selected filmography
 Liliomfi (1954)
 Two Half Times in Hell (1961)
 Tales of a Long Journey (1963)
 Football of the Good Old Days (1973)
 Jacob the Liar (1975) - Frankfurter
 A Strange Role (1976)
 My Father's Happy Years (1977)
 Anton the Magician (1978)
 Before the Bat's Flight Is Done (1989)
 The Pregnant Papa (1989)
 When the Stars Were Red (1991)
 Whoops (1993)
 Perlasca, un Eroe Italiano (2002)
 A Long Weekend in Pest and Buda (2003)
 East Side Stories (2010)

References

External links

1934 births
2011 deaths
Hungarian male film actors
Hungarian male television actors
Male actors from Budapest
Deaths from kidney disease